Tattoo Assassins is an unreleased 1994 fighting game developed by the pinball division of Data East for release in arcades. A few prototypes were test-marketed, but the game was never officially released. Spearheaded by Bob Gale (screenwriter for Back to the Future) and Joe Kaminkow (leader of Data East Pinball, now known as Stern Pinball), Tattoo Assassins was designed to be Data East's answer to Mortal Kombat.

The game was essentially completed before it was cancelled, though it has some minor gameplay and sound glitches, and prototype cabinets were released to test markets in 1994.

Reception 
Tattoo Assassins was reviewed in Next Generation; the reviewer panned the game for poor synchronization between controls and characters, sometimes choppy animation, and most especially the game's "extraordinary lack of any real innovation."

References

External links 
 Dan's Tattoo Assassins page
 
 System 16 arcade database (Data East ARM6 hardware roundup)
 Unseen64 feature (September 14, 2020. Article by Nolan Snoap.)

Cancelled arcade video games
Arcade-only video games
Arcade video games
Data East video games
Mortal Kombat clones
Obscenity controversies in video games
Video games with digitized sprites
Video games developed in the United States
Data East arcade games